Arshad Khan (born 20 December 1997) is an Indian cricketer. He made his List A debut on 24 February 2021, for Madhya Pradesh in the 2020–21 Vijay Hazare Trophy.

References

External links
 

1997 births
Living people
Indian cricketers
Madhya Pradesh cricketers
Place of birth missing (living people)
21st-century Indian people